Christopher Tower may refer to:
 Christopher Tower (c. 1694–1771), MP for Lancaster, Aylesbury and Bossinney
 Christopher Thomas Tower (1775–1867), grandson of the preceding, MP for Harwich
 Christopher Tower (1804–1884), son of the preceding, MP for Buckinghamshire